The Gila Mountains of Graham County are a mountain range in central-east Arizona. It borders the Gila River and Gila Valley on the valley's northeast in north-central Graham County; also the San Carlos Indian Reservation. The mountain range sits on the southern perimeter of the White Mountains and is located in the southeast area of Arizona's transition zone.

The Gila Mountains lie northwest of Safford, Arizona and the Santa Teresa Mountains lie to the southwest across the Gila Valley.

The Safford copper mine is located on the southern flank of the range.

External links
Location of Fishhooks Wilderness on Arizona-Southwest area map
Slaughter Mountain

Mountain ranges of Graham County, Arizona
Arizona transition zone mountain ranges
Mountain ranges of Arizona